Izatha gekkonella is a moth of the family Oecophoridae. It is endemic to New Zealand, where it is only known from the region of the Taieri and Shag River catchments in eastern Otago.

Description 
The wingspan is 13.5–15.5 mm for males and 13.5–17 mm for females. This species is very similar in appearance to I. convulsella but is slightly smaller and has a more brownish appearance.

Behaviour 
Adults have been recorded in October, November and December.

Larvae have been recorded feeding on lichens on rock-faces, making a silken web amongst the lichens.

Etymology
The name gekkonella means "little gecko" and refers to the mottled and scaly appearance of the moth under the microscope, as well as its gecko-like fondness for rockfaces. Geckos are common and diverse in the region of the South Island favoured by I. gekkonella.

References

Oecophorinae
Endemic fauna of New Zealand
Moths of New Zealand
Moths described in 2010
Endemic moths of New Zealand